Ascotaiwania is a genus of fungi in the Sordariomycetes class (subclass Sordariomycetidae) of the Ascomycota. In 2020, it was placed in the order Savoryellales and family of Savoryellaceae.

Species
As accepted by Species Fungorum;

Ascotaiwania hsilio 
Ascotaiwania latericolla 
Ascotaiwania licualae 
Ascotaiwania lignicola 
Ascotaiwania mauritiana 
Ascotaiwania mitriformis 
Ascotaiwania pallida 
Ascotaiwania palmicola 
Ascotaiwania pennisetorum 
Ascotaiwania sawadae 
Ascotaiwania wulai 

Former species;
 A. fusiformis  = Neoascotaiwania fusiformis, Sordariomycetidae
 A. hughesii  = Helicoascotaiwania hughesii, Pleurotheciaceae
 A. limnetica  = Neoascotaiwania limnetica, Sordariomycetidae
 A. persoonii  = Pseudoascotaiwania persoonii, Fuscosporellales
 A. terrestris  = Neoascotaiwania terrestris, Sordariomycetidae

References

Sordariomycetes enigmatic taxa
Sordariomycetes genera